Corporal Sidney Bates VC (14 June 1921 – 8 August 1944) was a British recipient of the Victoria Cross, the highest and most prestigious award for gallantry in the face of the enemy that can be awarded to British and Commonwealth forces.

Early life
Sidney Bates was born in Camberwell, London on 14 June 1921 to Frederick, a rag and bone man, and Gladys May Bates. At the outbreak of World War II , Bates was working as a carpenter's labourer. He joined the British Army and served with the 1st Battalion of the Royal Norfolk Regiment in June 1940 shortly after it returned from being stationed in Delhi, British India. By 1944, the battalion was part of the 185th Infantry Brigade, itself one of three brigades forming part of the 3rd Infantry Division. The battalion landed in Normandy on 6 June 1944 as part of Operation Overlord.

Military service
Bates was 23 years old, and a corporal in the 1st Battalion, Royal Norfolk Regiment, British Army during the Second World War, when the following deed took place for which he was awarded the Victoria Cross.

On 6 August 1944 near Sourdeval, France, Bates was commanding a section. Upon discovering that the enemy had penetrated deeply in the area occupied by his section, Bates seized a light machine-gun and charged, moving forward through a hail of bullets. Although twice wounded, he was undaunted and continued firing until the enemy started to withdraw from his fire. At that moment he was wounded for a third time — mortally. He still however continued to fire until his strength failed him. By this time the enemy had withdrawn and the situation had been restored, and the immediate threat to his platoon subsided. He died in hospital two days later.

The Norfolks' position was under attack by the 10th SS Panzer Division. The final costs of fighting around Sourdeval for the Norfolks was 160 casualties out of 550. The recommendation for the award was made by Major Cooper-Key, the commanding officer of B Company of the 1st Battalion. The recommendation was turned down initially but Cooper-Key persevered. According to Sergeant George Smith the battalion had been on the march when they had come under fire. A Bren gunner had been killed next to Corporal Bates, who had immediately seized the machine gun and started firing on the enemy.

Victoria Cross citation
The announcement and accompanying citation for the decoration was published in supplement to the London Gazette on 2 November 1945, reading

His Victoria Cross is displayed at The Royal Norfolk Regiment Museum, Norwich, England. The museum trustees purchased it for £20,000 in the 1980s. His was one of five VCs won by members of the Royal Norfolk Regiment during the Second World War.

There is a fitting memorial to Bates at Pavée.

Grave
The grave of Sidney Bates can be found in the Bayeux Commonwealth War Graves Commission Cemetery, Calvados, France. (Reference 20E)

References

British VCs of World War 2 (John Laffin, 1997)
Monuments to Courage (David Harvey, 1999)
The Register of the Victoria Cross (This England, 1997)

1921 births
1944 deaths
British Army recipients of the Victoria Cross
British Army personnel killed in World War II
British World War II recipients of the Victoria Cross
People from Camberwell
Royal Norfolk Regiment soldiers
Burials at Bayeux war cemetery
Military personnel from London
British Battle of Normandy recipients of the Victoria Cross